Heri Saputra (born August 28, 1989) is an Indonesian footballer who currently plays for Pusamania Borneo F.C.

References

External links
 

1989 births
Association football midfielders
Living people
Indonesian footballers
Liga 1 (Indonesia) players
PSAP Sigli players
Borneo F.C. players